The Apex Legends Global Series (ALGS) is a global competitive esports tournament series for the video game Apex Legends run by Electronic Arts and Respawn Entertainment. The series uses a promotion and relegation system throughout each season, culminating in the ALGS Championship. The ALGS was announced in 2019, with its inaugural season taking place in 2020–21.

History

Inaugural season 
In December 2019, Electronic Arts (EA) and Respawn Entertainment announced the first Apex Legends Global Series. The series was split up into total of 22 events over four phases, and each phase culminated in Major Events, the series' top-level events; the last Major of season, called the Apex Legends Global Series Championship, would determine the winner of the season. The first event of the season began in January 2020. The first online qualifiers was marred by game crashes disconnecting players from the server, as well as bugs within the game itself. On March 6, the first major was indefinitely postponed due to the COVID-19 pandemic. On March 31, the season shifted to a completely online format and introduced a tournament structure change that included the introduction of new tournaments. The ALGS Championship was divided into five separate championship matches by region — North America (NA), South America (SA), Europe, Middle East, and Africa (EMEA), Asia-Pacific North (APAC North), and Asia-Pacific South (APAC South). The ALGS Championship began on June 1, and the five regional champions of the season were Kungarna NA (North America), Paradox Esports (South America), Scarz Europe (EMEA), Fennel Korea (APAC North), and Wolfpack Arctic (APAC South).

2021–22 season 
For the second season of ALGS, the total prize pool was increased to $5million. EA and Respawn shifted the series to a different format and expanded it to allow Xbox and PlayStation players to compete. Viewership for the second season began slow, with an average viewership of less than 10,000 in North America and EMEA, the two most popular regions, throughout the regular season of first split. The Split One Playoffs saw a significant increase in viewership, peaking at over 300,000 viewers and averaging 55,000 — nearly the same viewership as the inaugural season ALGS Championship. With an average minute audience of over 539,000 and 10.3million total hours watched, the Split Two Playoffs on May 1, 2022, broke viewership records across all of EA's titles. The ALGS Championship was held at the PNC Arena in Raleigh, North Carolina on July 7–10. Unlike the previous season, there was only one championship match, with teams from all regions competing. The event had a $2million prize pool, and it marked the first time that the ALGS held a live-audience event. Australian team DarkZero Esports won the series' second season. The online regular season for split 1 of the ALGS Year 3 Pro League begins on November 6.

2022–23 season 
The third season of ALGS is underway. For this season, the prize pool will stay the same as before at $5 million. Although Split 1 dropped in viewership by 30%, it peaked at over 500,000 viewers during the playoffs across multiple channels on both Twitch.tv and YouTube. This Split was held at Copper Box Arena in London and introduced a new fast-paced format for the finals called Match Point. In this format, a team can only be crowned the victor once they win a game after they have already garnered 50 points. Although this season is just getting started, Split 1 was an amazing showcase of player skill and teamwork. Team Solo Mid ultimately took home the crown and took home $300,000 and their in-game-leader ImperialHal winning MVP of the tournament.

Format 
As of the 2021–22 season, the ALGS season format consists three phases: Split One, Split Two, and the ALGS Championship. Each split consists of a regular season, called the Pro League, and playoffs.

Each split consists of a regional Pro League regular season in each of its five regions: North America, EMEA, APAC South, APAC North, and South America. A total of 40 teams in each region compete in their region's Pro League, with teams coming from online qualifiers and direct invites based on previous performance. A total of 40 teams from the Pro Leagues then advance to the split playoffs. After the conclusion of the Split Two playoffs, the top performing teams from playoffs, along with teams that advance through "Last Chance Qualifier tournaments", advance to the ALGS Championship match.

Notes

References

External links 
 
 

Apex Legends competitions
World championships in esports
Recurring sporting events established in 2019